Flesh is soft body tissue.

Flesh may also refer to:

Film and television
Flesh (1932 film), an American film directed by John Ford
Flesh (1968 film), an American film directed by Paul Morrissey
The Flesh, a 1991 Italian film directed by Marco Ferreri
Flesh (web series), a 2020 Indian streaming series
"Flesh" (Charlie Jade), a 2005 television episode
The Flesh, in the TV series Doctor Who, a fictional technology in the 2011 episode "The Rebel Flesh"

Music
Flesh (album), by David Gray, 1994
 "Flesh", a song by Aerosmith from Get a Grip, 1993
 "Flesh", a song by Jan Johnston, 1999
 "Flesh", a song by Royce da 5'9" from Layers, 2016

Other uses
The edible portion of a fruit or vegetable
Flesh (mycology), the trama in mushrooms
Flesh (theology), in Christianity, a metaphor for sinful tendencies
Flesh (comics), a story in the comic 2000 AD
Flesh (novel), a 1960 novel by Philip José Farmer

See also

Flèche (disambiguation)
Flesch (disambiguation)
Fleisch (disambiguation)